The 1994 Pacific Tigers football team represented the University of the Pacific as a member of Big West Conference during the 1994 NCAA Division I-A football season. Led by third-year head coach Chuck Shelton, Pacific compiled an overall record 6–5 with a conference mark of 4–2, placing fourth in the Big West. The Tigers offense scored 252 points while the defense allowed 275 points.

Schedule

References

Pacific
Pacific Tigers football seasons
Pacific Tigers football